The Machaa ( in short Macha, Amharic: ሜጫ) are a subgroup of the Oromo people in western and Central Oromia . They live south of the Blue Nile (Abbai) in the northwestern part of the region of Oromia and in parts of West Shewa Zone, South West Shewa Zone, Oromia Special Zone Surrounding Finfinnee, West Welega Zone, East Welega Zone, Jimma, Jimma Zone, Illubabor Zone, Kelam Welega Zone and Horo Guduru. A small group of them lives in the area north of the Blue Nile Wambara in the Benishangul-Gumuz Region.

The area of Macha is a high plateau with undulating hills and some of the higher mountain ranges. Traditionally Macha hardly move below 1500 meters above sea level, since there is a risk of sleeping sickness and malaria would exist.

History 
The Macha came in the second half of the 16th Century as part of the general expansion of the Oromo in the area south of the Blue Nile. The previously existing state formations were there because of the war between the Ethiopian Empire and the Adal Sultanate under Ahmed Gran destroyed and through campaigns and slave raids Christian warlords and kings already decimated the local population. The Ethiopian monk Bahrey most important chronicler of the Oromo hikes called the Macha and Tulama as subgroups of the Borana and mentions various clans and lineages of Macha .

The establishment of Macha in their present territory seems to be done in small groups and not by larger segments, so that the same clan names are present on a number of places in the area. The existing Omotic and Nilo-Saharan speaking population has been subjected to as gabaro (also gabbaro or Gabar, Oromo for "those who serve") called and gradually assimilated and added to the clan structures of Macha.

The Macha originally had a common Gadaa system with Tulama whose center (chaffe) was south of present-day Addis Ababa. But in the late 16th century, Macha established their own Gadaa with chaffe in Odaa Bilii / Tute Bisil upper Gibe Valley. A man named Makkoo Bilii called there, the independent Gadaa of Macha. In their lore, and Macha Tulama make mutually responsible for this break.

In 1963
, Macha and Tulama Self-Help Association was established mainly by Oromo, but also by members of other ethnic groups in southern Ethiopia. This was first engaged mainly local issues and the promotion of local development began, but soon also for political and cultural freedoms for all Oromo use. As a result, it was banned 1967. In 1994, a successor organization was founded, which was banned in 2004 again. The Macha are the westernmost Cushitic Horners of the Horn peninsula.

References 
 :de:Macha-Oromo
 Jan Hultin: Mäč̣č̣a und Mäč̣č̣a and Tulama, in: Siegbert Uhlig (Hrsg.): Encyclopaedia Aethiopica, Band 3, 2008, 
 Alessandro Triulzi: United and Divided. Boorana and Gabaro among the Macha Oromo in Western Ethiopia, in: Paul TW Baxter, Jan Hultin, Alessandro Triulzi: Being and Becoming Oromo. Historical and Anthropological Enquiries. Nordiska Afrikainstitutet, Uppsala, 1996,  (p. 251-264)

Ethnic groups in Ethiopia
Oromo groups
Borana Oromo